The 173rd Aviation Squadron is an Australian Army helicopter training squadron equipped with MRH 90 Taipan helicopters and provides support to the Special Operations Command. The squadron is based at Luscombe Airfield, Holsworthy Barracks, Sydney and forms part of the 6th Aviation Regiment. The squadron may have been renamed as it does not appear in an Army December 2020 Order of battle.

The squadron originally operated fixed-wing aircraft designated as the 173rd General Support Squadron and was later renamed the 173rd Surveillance Squadron. In 2010, the squadron was renamed the 173rd Aviation Squadron when it transitioned to rotary aircraft.

History
On 17 February 1974, the 173rd General Support Squadron was formed as part of the 1st Aviation Regiment based at Oakey and initially operated 6 Pilatus PC-6 Porters. In 1978, the squadron also received 11 GAF Nomad aircraft. During this time, the squadron undertook a variety of Army co-operation roles utilising the short take-off and landing characteristics of its aircraft. These included: artillery spotting, troop transport, field resupply, medevac, ground-air liaison. It was also used for survey work in the South Pacific and flood relief in Australia. In 1978, the squadron was involved in Operation Cenderawasih a mapping program in Irian Jaya in Indonesia with the Indonesian Army.

With the retirement of the Porters in October 1992, the following year the squadron adopted the title of "173rd Surveillance Squadron" under this guise it undertook the aerial surveillance and survey roles and was also used as a vehicle to deliver parachute troops. In 1993, it acquired 12 more Nomads, mainly unsold civilian variants which had been kept in storage, to replace the Porters.

In August 1995, following the fatal crashes involving Nomads from the Royal Australian Air Force (RAAF) and the School of Army Aviation, the aircraft were withdrawn from service. Most of the Nomad fleet was sold to the Indonesian Navy but two were retained as unflyable training aids.

As a consequence, the squadron operated 4 Embraer EMB 110P1 Bandeirante aircraft leased from Flight West Airlines temporarily while a replacement for the Nomad was found. From 1996, these aircraft were replaced with 3 Beechcraft King Air B200 aircraft leased from Hawker Pacific to be based at Oakley and 3 de Havilland Canada DHC-6 Twin Otter 320 aircraft leased from Hawker Pacific to be based in Darwin. On 9 November 1997, Twin Otter VH-HPY was lost in a tropical mountainous training accident in Papua New Guinea, resulting in serious injuries to the three trainees and instructor onboard.

The squadron served in several East Timor operations including INTERFET, UNTAET, UNMISET and Operation Astute. A squadron King Air was the first ADF aircraft to land in Dili ahead of the INTERFET peace-keeping taskforce in 1999.

By 2004, the remaining Twin Otter aircraft based in Darwin had been withdrawn from service, while the King Air B200 was replaced by the more modern King Air B350 variant leased from Hawker Pacific. Restructuring of Army's aviation capability saw the squadron separated from 1st Aviation Regiment and placed under the command of 16th Aviation Brigade as an independent unit.

By 2007, further re-organisation assigned all fixed-wing military aircraft to the RAAF and the squadron was to relocate to Sydney as a helicopter training and surveillance squadron under the newly raised 6th Aviation Regiment. In March 2008, the squadron became part of the 6th Aviation Regiment. On 20 November 2009, the squadron handed the King Air over to the RAAF.

On 11 February 2010, the squadron was renamed as the "173rd Aviation Squadron" converting to rotary aircraft based with the 171st Aviation Squadron (now 171st Special Operations Aviation Squadron) at the recently redeveloped Luscombe Army Airfield operating a fleet of Bell 206B-1 Kiowa helicopters. The Kiowas were operated to provide training for graduate pilots unable to undertake operational conversions to the delayed MRH 90 Taipan and Tiger ARH helicopters. The Kiowa had been retired on 26 October 2009 from the 1st Aviation Regiment.

In 2013, the squadron transitioned to the Black Hawk helicopter with the role of providing support to the Special Operations Command and returned the Kiowa to the Army Aviation Training Centre at Oakey.

In February 2019, the squadron commenced transitioning from the retiring Black Hawk helicopters to the MRH-90 Taipan helicopters with the transition completed in December 2021.

Notes

References

External links

 Bandeirante – ADF-Serials
 Twin Otter – ADF-Serials

Aviation units and formations of the Australian Army
Military units and formations established in 1974
Cold War history of Australia